Jonathan de Amo Pérez (born 13 January 1990 in Barcelona, Catalonia) is a Spanish footballer who plays as a central defender for Polish club GKS Górnik Łęczna.

References

External links

1990 births
Living people
Spanish footballers
Footballers from Barcelona
Association football defenders
Segunda División B players
Tercera División players
CF Damm players
UE Cornellà players
UE Sant Andreu footballers
Rayo Cantabria players
Ontinyent CF players
RCD Espanyol B footballers
Celta de Vigo B players
Ekstraklasa players
I liga players
Widzew Łódź players
Miedź Legnica players
Stal Mielec players
Bruk-Bet Termalica Nieciecza players
Górnik Łęczna players
Spanish expatriate footballers
Expatriate footballers in Poland
Spanish expatriate sportspeople in Poland